Louis-Vincent-Joseph Le Blond, comte de Saint-Hilaire (4 September 1766 – 5 June 1809) was a French general during the Revolutionary and Napoleonic Wars, described by Lejeune as "the pride of the army, as remarkable for his wit as for his military talents."

Origins and early career
Louis-Vincent-Joseph Le Blond de Saint-Hilaire was born in Ribemont, Aisne on 4 September 1766, the son of a captain in the Conti cavalry regiment. He became a cadet in his father's regiment on 13 September 1777, aged 11. In 1781, he sailed for the East Indies as a second lieutenant in the Binch hussars. Whilst there, he transferred to the Aquitaine infantry regiment (later renamed the 35th infantry regiment) on 16 September 1783. He returned to France in 1785, and was promoted to lieutenant on 1 June 1788 and captain on 1 July 1792.

French Revolutionary Wars
Saint-Hilaire served in Army of the Alps from 1792 to 1793. He commanded the left wing of the advanced guard at the Siege of Toulon in 1793, and it was here that he first met Napoleon.  After the fall of the city, he was promoted to provisional adjudant-général chef de bataillon by representatives of the people Saliceti and Barras on 27 December 1793 and posted to Masséna's Army of Italy. He took part in the expedition to Oneglia on 5 April 1794 as part of Mouret's division before coming under General Laharpe's command in August that year. Laharpe wrote this appraisal of the young officer:

On 3 December 1794, he was provisionally promoted to adjudant général chef de brigade by representatives of the people Ritter, Turreau and Saliceti. At the head of two companies of scouts, he seized the Col de Thernes near Ormea on 14 April 1795 and defended it for three hours against a whole Piedmontese regiment, taking 300 prisoners. His promotion was confirmed by the Committee of Public Safety on 13 June 1795. Ordered by Kellermann to defend a position nicknamed Little Gibraltar with 480 men, he fought off an attack by 9000 Austro-Sardinian troops on 19 September 1795, taking 600 prisoners. 

Provisionally promoted to général de brigade on 26 September 1795, Saint-Hilaire led a column of 3000 men in the battle of Loano. During the battle he was struck by a canister shot and lost two fingers from his left hand. During the course of 1796, he led brigades in the divisions of Laharpe, Massena, Augereau and Sauret.

He served as commander of Toulon and Marseille and was promoted to general of division at the end of 1799.

Napoleonic Wars
From 1805 onwards, Saint-Hilaire would continually serve in the Grande Armée, holding various divisional commands. In 1805, he commanded a division in Marshal Jean-de-Dieu Soult's IV Corps during the War of the Third Coalition and at the Battle of Austerlitz, he led a decisive assault on the Pratzen plateau, receiving a serious wound at the beginning of the assault but nonetheless retaining his command for the rest of the battle. Between 1806 and 1807, he fought with distinction at Jena, Eylau and Heilsberg. He was made a Count of the Empire in 1808 and received a divisional command in the Army of Germany, with which he would campaign in southern Germany and Austria. On 22 April 1809, Saint-Hilaire distinguished himself under Napoleon's eyes at the Battle of Eckmühl.

On 22 May 1809, Saint-Hilaire had his left leg torn off by a cannonball at the Battle of Aspern-Essling and died of gangrene 15 days later. In 1810, Napoleon ordered his remains interred in the Panthéon alongside Marshal Jean Lannes. The name Saint-Hilaire is inscribed under the Arc de Triomphe in Paris.

References

French military personnel of the French Revolutionary Wars
French commanders of the Napoleonic Wars
French military personnel killed in the Napoleonic Wars
1766 births
1809 deaths
Names inscribed under the Arc de Triomphe